Neolasioptera desmodii is a species of gall midges, insects in the family Cecidomyiidae.

References

Further reading

 
 

Cecidomyiinae
Articles created by Qbugbot
Insects described in 1907